
Gmina Duszniki is a rural gmina (administrative district) in Szamotuły County, Greater Poland Voivodeship, in west-central Poland.

Villages
Gmina Duszniki contains the villages and settlements of Brzoza, Ceradz Dolny, Chełminko, Duszniki, Grodziszczko, Grzebienisko, Kunowo, Mieściska, Młynkowo, Niewierz, Podrzewie, Sarbia, Sędzinko, Sędziny, Sękowo, Wierzeja, Wilczyna, Wilkowo, Zakrzewko and Zalesie.

Neighbouring gminas
Gmina Duszniki is bordered by the gminas of Buk, Kaźmierz, Kuślin, Lwówek, Opalenica, Pniewy and Tarnowo Podgórne.

International relations

Twin towns — Sister cities
 Illuka Parish, Estonia

References
Polish official population figures 2006

Duszniki
Szamotuły County